Xanthophyllum octandrum, commonly known as Macintyre's boxwood, false jitta, yellow boxwood or sovereignwood, is a slow-growing tree in the milkwort family Polygalaceae which has the potential to reach thousands of years of age. It is endemic to coastal northeastern Queensland, Australia.

Description
The globular orange fruits are  diameter. The fruit splits along irregular lines to reveal a single seed which is completely enclosed in a black aril.

This species is very slow growing and the largest trees in its range are believed to be of great age. One specimen has been radiocarbon dated at 3,500 years old.

Taxonomy
This species was first described in 1865 by the German-born Australian botanist Ferdinand von Mueller as Macintyria octandra. Mueller's description was based on specimens collected by John Dallachy at Rockingham Bay in Queensland, and was published in volume 5 of his work Fragmenta phytographiæ Australiæ. Apparently through oversight, Mueller published a second description shortly afterwards in the same year, this time giving it the combination Xanthophyllum macintyrii. The latter is an illegitmate name because it was based on the same type material.

In 1927 the Czech botanist Karel Domin published a new description in Bibliotheca Botanica, giving the species its current binomial combination.

Etymology
The genus name Xanthophyllum is a combination of the Ancient Greek words xanthós, "yellow", and fýllo, "leaf", a reference to the colour of aging leaves. The species epithet octandrum is from octo, "eight", and andro, "male". This refers to the eight stamens in the flower.

Distribution and habitat

Treatments of this species in both Flora of Australia and Australian Tropical Rainforest Plants state that it is endemic to Queensland.

In Australia it occurs in a number of disjunct populations. The Australasian Virtual Herbarium has records in the following areas (listed from north to south): the tip of Cape York, both close to and within the Apudthama (formerly Jardine River) National Park; in the vicinity of Kutini-Payamu (Iron Range) National Park; a small cluster of sightings near Coen; the largest area with the majority of official sightings, from Cooktown to Lucinda, including the Atherton Tablelands; a cluster in the Paluma Range National Park; two occurrences on Mount Elliot; and the southernmost grouping at Eungella National Park, near Mackay.

Ecology
Fruits of Macintyre's boxwood are eaten by cassowaries (Casuarius casuarius), Sulphur-crested cockatoos (Cacatua galerita), Metallic starlings (Aplonis metallica) and Golden bowerbirds (Prionodura newtoniana). The leaves are eaten by Lumholtz's tree-kangaroos (Dendrolagus lumholtzi).

Conservation
 this species is listed as least concern by both the Queensland Department of Environment and Science and the IUCN.

The IUCN cites a wide distribution and no identified current or future threats as the justification for their assessment. It was last assessed by the group on 12 June 2018.

Uses
Extracts of the bark of Xanthophyllum octandrum have shown strong cytotoxic activity, and thus a potential use in pharmacology.

Gallery

References

External links
 
 
 View a map of historical sightings of this species at the Australasian Virtual Herbarium
 View observations of this species on iNaturalist
 View images of this species on Flickriver

octandrum
Trees of Australia
Endemic flora of Australia
Flora of Queensland
Plants described in 1927
Taxa named by Ferdinand von Mueller
Taxa named by Karel Domin